The dusky piha (Lipaugus fuscocinereus) is a species of bird in the family Cotingidae.

It is found in Colombia, Ecuador, and Peru. Its natural habitat is subtropical or tropical moist montane forests.  They have a restricted range, but a steady population, therefore are not classified as a vulnerable species.

References

dusky piha
Birds of the Colombian Andes
Birds of the Ecuadorian Andes
Birds of the Peruvian Andes
dusky piha
Taxonomy articles created by Polbot